Daisy Ho Chiu-fung (born 1964) is a Hong Kong businesswoman who is the daughter of Macau-based businessman Stanley Ho. She is the chairman and executive director of SJM Holdings, a major owner, operator and developer of casinos in Macau. She is also an executive director of Shun Tak Holdings.

Biography 
Ho was born in 1964. She is the second daughter of Stanley Ho and his second wife. Her siblings are Pansy Ho, Josie Ho, Maisy Ho, and Lawrence Ho.

Ho earned an MBA in finance from the University of Toronto and BA in marketing from the University of Southern California. She worked for several investment banks before joining Shun Tak Holdings in 1994 as executive director and was appointed chief financial officer in 1999.

In 2013, Ho became chairwoman of Hong Kong Ballet and performed from Swan Lake at the Hong Kong Tatler Ball. She also chairs the University of Toronto (Hong Kong) Foundation, a scholarship fund that sends academically gifted Hong Kong students on a scholarship to U of T, and serves on the dean's advisory board of the Rotman School of Management.

In 2018, Ho became Chairman of the board of director and Executive Director of SJM Holdings, succeeding her father, Stanley Ho. She is also the Executive Director and Deputy Managing Director of Shun Tak Holdings.

Ho has served as a director and chairman of Hong Kong charity Po Leung Kuk, Vice President of the Real Estate Developers Association of Hong Kong, and a member of the Chinese General Chamber of Commerce. She became the chairwoman of the Hong Kong Ballet again in 2020  and was also the Chief Commissioner of the Hong Kong Girl Guides Association.

Personal life 
Ho has two children, Beatrice Ho and Gillian Ho, graduates of Princeton University and Columbia University, respectively.

References 

Living people
Hong Kong businesspeople
Hong Kong casino industry businesspeople
1964 births
Hong Kong women in business
Hong Kong people of Dutch-Jewish descent
Macau emigrants to Hong Kong
Ho family
Hong Kong real estate businesspeople
University of Toronto alumni
University of Southern California alumni
Members of the Election Committee of Hong Kong, 2017–2021